Rubroboletus sinicus is a bolete fungus in the family Boletaceae. It is found in China. The species was first described by Wei Fan Chiu as Boletus sinicus in 1948, and transferred to the genus Tylopilus in 1979 by Fanglan Tai. In 2014, the genus Rubroboletus was created to accommodate this and allied species.

The pores are red and small, up to 0.5 mm across. The flesh is initially white to yellowish, but stains blue with injury. Spores are ellipsoid and measure 7.5–11 by 4.5–5.5 µm. The type collection was obtained from a market in Kunming in July, 1938.

References

External links

Boletaceae
Fungi described in 1948
Fungi of China
sinicus